The Clifty Limestone is a Middle Devonian geologic formation in the Ozark Plateaus of Arkansas.  The name was introduced in 1916 by Albert Homer Purdue and Hugh Dinsmore Miser in their study of northern Arkansas. They designated a stratotype along the East Fork of Little Clifty Creek in Benton County, Arkansas.

See also

 List of fossiliferous stratigraphic units in Arkansas
 Paleontology in Arkansas

References

Devonian Arkansas